Woodfield is a former railway station in Woodfield, Victoria, Australia. There is no longer a station building at the site of the station.
A Goods yard also once existed, and was used to load and unload grain trains.

References

External links
Victorian Railway Stations - Woodfield

Railway stations in Australia opened in 1891
Railway stations closed in 1978
Disused railway stations in Victoria (Australia)
Mansfield railway line